VICE is a documentary series that debuted on HBO on April 5, 2013. Created and hosted by VICE founder Shane Smith, the series uses immersionist style of documentary filmmaking to cover various topics from around the world for each episode that were told by its respective correspondent.

Seasons 3 and 4 were commissioned on May 7, 2014. On March 26, 2015, HBO renewed VICE through 2018 which includes four additional seasons. The 18-episode fifth season, slated to air on February 24, 2017, received an additional twelve episodes that brought the season to a total of 30 episodes.

The series was picked up by Showtime after being cancelled by HBO, and resumed on March 29, 2020. 137 episodes have aired as of December 4, 2021.

Series overview

Episodes

Season 1 (2013)

Season 2 (2014)

Season 3 (2015)

Season 4 (2016)

Season 5 (2017)

Season 6 (2018)

Season 7 (2020)

Season 8 (2021)

Season 9 (2022)

Specials

References

External links
 
 
 

Vice